"You Don't Know" is a song by Smoove & Turrell, released both as a CD and 12 inch single, including remixes by Kraak & Smaak as well as Featurecast, on Jalapeño Records in 2009. It was also released as a track on the Smoove & Turrell 2009 album Antique Soul, as well as on the compilation album, Wavemusic: Soul Ya 3. "You Don't Know" was written by Jonathan Scott Watson (known as Smoove), John Turrell, Lynsey de Paul and Barry Blue, and sampled the track "Water" from de Paul's debut album, Surprise.

In an interview, Smoove said "I wanted a retro feel while keeping hip-hop production values in my beats. It reflects the different styles I play in my DJ sets - soul, latin, funk, jazz, easy listening, northern soul and hip hop. I'm a real crate digger and only play vinyl in my DJ sets. I found an amazing track by 70's songwriter Lynsey de Paul that we sampled for You Don't Know. Normally samples take forever to clear but someone played it directly to Lynsey and she loved it. We got everything cleared the same day". The song received positive reviews from the music press.

The song was play-listed on BBC Radio 6 Music and on The Craig Charles Funk and Soul Show. It was also played by DJs Mark Lamarr, Annie Nightingale, Janice Long and Mark Radcliffe, and it received favourable reviews. In March 2019, the song was included on the Smoove & Turrell compilation CD, Solid Brass: Ten Years of Northern Funk. 

On their 2020 album Stratos Bleu, Smoove & Turrell featured a track entitled "Still Don't Know", that is a remake of "You Don’t Know".

References

2009 songs
Songs written by Lynsey de Paul
Songs written by Barry Blue